Posada del Bierzo is a village in the municipality of Carracedelo, in the region of El Bierzo, in the  province of Leon, in Castile and Leon, (Spain).

History

In the late 1950s construction of the  forced the relocation of the inhabitants of two villages which were to be inundated, ancient Barcena and Posada del Rio. The result was the construction of Posada del Bierzo.

Demographic evolution

Landmark buildings and interesting places

  
 The Square Simón González Ferrando. Inaugurated by General Francisco Franco, on 16 September 1961.
 Saint Isidro's Church.
 The four spouts Fountain.
 
 San Isidro Museum, created by Mr. Dario Martinez.
 The Olde Oven, Ethnographic Heritage.

Festivals and cultural activities 

 January 5: Visit of the Three Wishes Kings and a chocolate party.
 February/March: Carnival. 
 May 15: Saint Isidro Labrador (Village's Pattern).
 June 23: Bonfire of San Juan.
 July: Trip by the association.
 July–August: Summer parties.
 November: Magosto (chestnut party).
 December: Nativity scene in the village's church.

Economy

Agriculture 
In the village fruit production predominates, particularly pears and apples. They are shipped  to cooperatives and exported to various cities of Europe.

Climate

El Bierzo